Gordon Fripp Henderson,  (April 17, 1912 – August 17, 1993) was a Canadian intellectual property lawyer who joined the law firm Gowling Lafleur Henderson LLP in 1937, and later became its chairman. He was known for his advocacy on intellectual property matters as well as his involvement in intellectual property organizations throughout his career.  Henderson's contribution to the development of Canadian and international jurisprudence is described as one of the most significant in Canadian legal history.

Henderson was a philanthropist and civic leader in Ottawa having lent his support to many causes.  He was the president of the Canadian Bar Association and the chancellor of the University of Ottawa.  He was instrumental in the foundation of SOCAN as its lawyer and later as chairman.  For his service he received the 1988 B'nai B'rith Award of Merit and a Companionship within the Order of Canada.

Biography

Personal life and education
Henderson was born in Ottawa, Ontario, on April 17, 1912.  His father was defense lawyer Gordon Smith Henderson KC and his mother was Charlotte Stratton.  Henderson was an only child and grew up in fairy affluent surroundings. He was a member of the Henderson family, the grandson of William Henderson and the nephew of Stuart Alexander Henderson, who was described as one of the best criminal lawyers in the country. 
He received a Bachelor of Arts degree from the University of Toronto in 1934 and graduated from Osgoode Hall Law School in 1937. In 1942 he married Joan Parkins, and they had three children together: Joanne Nelson, Gordon Henderson, and Robert Henderson.  He was a part owner of the Ottawa Rough Riders from 1967 to 1969, during which the team won 2 Grey cup championships in 1968 and 1969. In 1965 He was elected president of CKOY limited, now CIWW (CityNews Ottawa), and was a part owner in CKOY as well as in Ottawa Cablevision.  In 1980, Henderson joined the board of directors at Selkirk Communications. Henderson passed away on August 17, 1993, in Ottawa.

Law career

Advocacy 
Upon his call to the bar, Henderson joined the firm of Henderson & Herridge (which later became Gowling Lafleur Henderson). Within 3 years, and before the age of 28, Henderson had appeared successfully on two separate occasions at the Supreme Court of Canada. Throughout his career, Henderson developed a reputation for litigation in all areas of law, especially in intellectual property.  Former Ontario Superior Court Justice Roydon Kealey referred to Henderson as "one of three top lawyers in Canada. He was a legend, a prodigious worker, and more or less a genius."  Ian Scott, former Attorney General of Ontario, called him "the best all-round lawyer the profession has produced since the War." By the time of his death, Henderson appeared as counsel in nearly 400 reported cases, including 90 before the Supreme Court of Canada.

Professional associations 
Henderson was also an active participant in professional associations both within and outside the legal community. He was heavily involved in the Intellectual Property Institute of Canada and was the president of the Canadian Bar Association from 1979 to 1980. He was also involved with the International Bar Association as a member of the council of the business law section.  Henderson helped found the Canadian Law Information Council.

He was also the founding editor of the Canadian Patent Reporter (CPR) (which he started in 1941). The CPR was one of the first continuous case reporters for Canadian intellectual property law decisions, and remains a leading reporter today. For most of its existence, Henderson wrote virtually every headnote and comment in the publication.

In his later years, Henderson served on the Board of Governors of the University of Ottawa, and from 1991 until his death in 1993, he was Chancellor of the university.

He was the first honorary chairperson for REACH Canada (1981), an organization that assists people with disabilities in getting legal help.

Notable Supreme Court Cases 
Tennessee Eastman Co v. Canada (Commissioner of Patents): Henderson represented the appellant (Tennessee Eastman Co) and lost.

Capital City V. CRTC: Henderson acted on behalf of the appellants (Capital City). The court held that the content on both cable and broadcast television was within the jurisdiction of the Federal Government. Henderson lost this case. (1978)

Johnson (S.C.) and Son, Ltd. et al. v. Marketing International Ltd. (1980)

St. Peter's Evangelical Lutheran Church v. Ottawa (1982)

R. v. Eldorado Nuclear Ltd.; R. v. Uranium Canada Ltd.: Henderson represented the appellant (Uranium Canada). Henderson argued that as a crown company, Uranium Canada could not be prosecuted, and he won. (1983)

Operation Dismantle v. R: Henderson represented the appellant (Operation Dismantle) and lost.

International Woodworkers of America, Local 2-69 v. Consolidated-Bathurst Packaging Ltd: Henderson acted on behalf of the respondent (Ontario Labour Relations Board) and won.

Music Industry 

Henderson was instrumental in the formation of SOCAN, a major Canadian copyright collective, as its lawyer and later as chairman. Henderson was in charge of the Performing Rights Organization of Canada (PROCAN), which merged with the Composers, Authors, and Publishers Association of Canada (CAPAC) to create SOCAN in 1990. BMI's president Edward M. Cramer credits the initiative for the merger to himself and Gordon Henderson. Today SOCAN represents over 135,000 people in the music industry.

The Gordon F. Henderson/SOCAN Copyright Competition was named in his honour in 1990 and annually has offered a prize of $2000 to a Canadian law student, or lawyer in their first year of articling, for an essay on the subject of copyright relating to music

At the time of his death, Henderson was a member of the Senate of the Stratford Festival

Legacy 
Henderson was a philanthropist, humanitarian and civic leader in his native Ottawa, having founded or lent his support to numerous causes. He was the founder of the Community Foundation of Ottawa and the Ottawa School Breakfasts Program.  His decades of service to the University of Ottawa Heart Institute Foundation were recognized by the establishment of the Gordon F. Henderson Chair in Leadership to be held by the CEO of the institute. The University of Ottawa recognized Henderson's leadership through an endowment supporting the Gordon F. Henderson Chair in Human Rights.  

In September 2019, the county of Carleton Law Association (CCLA) announced that their library would bear the name of The Gordon F. Henderson Library.  Alongside this, since 1992, the CCLA has given out The Gordon F. Henderson award to legal community members who have made a significant contribution to the community through charitable services.  Past winners include Lawrence Greenspon and Warren Creates. The Gordon Henderson postdoctoral fellowship was established at the University of Ottawa in his name.  The fellowship is offered to a researcher with an innovative and promising research project which aligns with the mandate of the Human Rights Research and Education Centre (HRREC) at the University of Ottawa.

Honours and awards

Appointments and Awards 

  Queen's Counsel (QC)
  1988 B'nai B'rith Award of Merit
  Honorary Consul to Liberia in Canada

  1983-1993: Life bencher of the Law Society of Upper Canada

Honorary doctorates 

  1979: University of Ottawa (L.L.D)
  1982: Law Society of Upper Canada (L.L.D.)
  1984: Carleton University (L.L.D.)

Honorific eponyms 

  Gordon F. Henderson Award (CCLA)
  Gordon F. Henderson/SOCAN Copyright Award

  Gordon F. Henderson Postdoctoral Fellowship
  Gordon F. Henderson Chair in Human Rights
  Ottawa Heart Institute Gordon F. Henderson Chair in Leadership

  Gordon F. Henderson Law Library

Order of Canada Citation 
Henderson was appointed a Companion of the Order of Canada on November 8, 1988.  His citation reads:One of Canada's top lawyers, he has served his profession and his community with equal distinction. Even while serving in positions as varied as President of the Canadian Bar Association and Chairman of the Board of Governors of the University of Ottawa, he has devoted himself to a variety of humanitarian causes which have earned him the 1988 Award of Merit of the B'nai B'rith Foundation.

Selected publications

Books 
 Henderson Gordon F and National Judicial Institute. Copyright and Confidential Information Law in Canada. Carswell 1994.
 Henderson Gordon F and National Judicial Institute. Patent Law of Canada. Carswell 1994.
 Henderson Gordon F. Intellectual Property : Litigation Legislation and Education : A Study of the Canadian Intellectual Property and Litigation System. Consumer and Corporate Affairs Canada 1991.
 Henderson Gordon F. Trade-Marks Law of Canada. Carswell 1993.
 Henderson Gordon F. Canadian patent reporter: Third series. Canada Law Book Co 1985-1999

Articles 
 Henderson Gordon F. “Book Review: Copyright and Performing Rights.” The University of Toronto Law Journal 1959 pp. 116–118.
 Henderson, Gordon F. "Patent Licensing: Problems from the Imprecision of the English Language." Ottawa L. Rev. 4 (1970): 62.
 Henderson, Gordon F. "Foreign Court and the National Interest, the Effect of Foreign Judgments on Activities in Canada." Int'l Bus. Law. 3 (1975): 133.
 Henderson, Gordon F., and Emilio S. Binavince. "Doing Business in Canada and the Judicial Review of Wrongful Government Statutory and Regulatory Action." Can.-USLJ 7 (1984): 1.

References

External links 

 Gordon Henderson Obituary
 Henderson's wedding in the newspaper
 Henderson's death in Billboard Magazine 

1912 births
1993 deaths
Lawyers in Ontario
Chancellors of the University of Ottawa
Companions of the Order of Canada
Canadian Bar Association Presidents
People from Ottawa
University of Toronto alumni
Canadian King's Counsel
20th-century Canadian lawyers